Tad Hills (born April 1, 1963 in Needham, Massachusetts) is an American children’s book author and illustrator. His first picture book, Duck & Goose, a New York Times bestseller and ALA Notable Book for Children, is about a pair of feathered friends. In a starred review, Kirkus Reviews wrote that “readers will likely hope to see more of this adorable odd couple”—a hope that was realized. The Duck & Goose series now contains nine titles, including Duck, Duck, Goose; Duck & Goose Find a Pumpkin; and Duck & Goose, It’s Time for Christmas. Hills is also the author of How Rocket Learned to Read, winner of the Irma Simonton Black & James H. Black Award for Excellence in Children's Literature and a New York Times bestseller. A sequel, Rocket Writes a Story, was published to similar acclaim, debuting at #1 on the New York Times Best Seller List and named as a top picture book of the year by Amazon.com, Barnes & Noble, Publishers Weekly, and School Library Journal.

Early life and career
Hills was raised in Norwell, Massachusetts in a creative household. His grandmother was an accomplished artist—together, she and Hills created paintings, drawings, and books. His mother, a 4th-grade science teacher, inspired his love of nature by frequently bringing home animals (including raccoons, owls, and other wild creatures). 
“I come from a long line of engineers on both sides, so my interest in making things almost feels like it could be genetic,” Hills has said.

Hills graduated with a degree in Art from Skidmore College in New York. He states, however, that his greatest educational experience has been raising his children: “Spending time with my kids helps me remember what it’s like to be a child. I try to capture that innocence and enthusiastic vision of the world in my books. I want kids to see themselves in my characters”.

Hills has dabbled in many arts, including acting, jewelry-making, and interior designing. He began illustrating picture books in the late 90s when his wife, Lee Wade, was the VP and creative director for Simon & Schuster’s children’s book division: “Lee used to ask me to try illustrating some books she couldn’t find an illustrator for,” he said. Hills published the first book in his breakout Duck & Goose series in 2006, when Wade and friend Anne Schwartz began Schwartz & Wade Books (a Random House imprint).

Hills lives in Brooklyn with his wife and two children.

Selected bibliography
Author & Illustrator:
 Duck & Goose, Goose Needs a Hug (2012)
 Rocket Writes a Story (2012)
 Duck & Goose, Here Comes the Easter Bunny! (2012)
 Duck & Goose, It’s Time for Christmas (2010)
 Duck & Goose, How Are You Feeling? (2009)
 Duck & Goose, Find a Pumpkin (2009)
 Duck & Goose, 1, 2, 3 (2008)
 What’s Up, Duck? (2008)
 Duck, Duck, Goose (2007)
 Duck & Goose (2006)
 My Fuzzy Safari Babies: A Book to Touch & Feel (2001)
 My Fuzzy Farm Babies: A Book to Touch & Feel (2001)
 Knock Knock Who’s There?: My First Book of Knock Knock Jokes (2000)
 My Fuzzy Friends (1999)

Illustrator:
 Waking Up, Wendell by April Stevens (2007)
 Hey Diddle Riddle by Wendi Silvano (2004)
 Tom Cringle: The Pirate and the Patriot by Gerald Hausman (2001)
 Tom Cringle: Battle on the High Seas by Gerald Hausman (2000)
 A Name on the Quilt by Jeannine Atkins (1999)

References

External links 
 Tad Hills' Official Website
 Tad Hills' Random House Profile

American children's writers
1963 births
Living people